Blonded Radio (stylized as blonded RADIO) is Frank Ocean's Apple Music 1 radio show that originally lasted from February to August 2017, with four additional special episodes that aired in November and December 2018, four more episodes from October to December 2019, and another episode in December 2021. The show is hosted by Ocean, Vegyn, and Roof Access and usually airs a new single from Ocean each episode. A fictional radio station based on the show, titled "Blonded Los Santos 97.8", was added to the video game Grand Theft Auto V in December 2017.

History

Original run (2017)
The first episode, Episode 001, aired on February 24, 2017. It showcased the collaborative song "Slide" by record producer Calvin Harris featuring Ocean and rappers Quavo and Offset from the American hip hop group Migos. The episode also included an interview with Jay-Z talking about the current state of radio and the music industry. Episode 002 aired on March 10, 2017, with the single "Chanel", a song about Ocean's bisexuality. The episode ended with repeats of "Chanel", sometimes featuring a verse from rapper ASAP Rocky.

Episode 003 aired on April 8, 2017. The episode ended by playing a new single titled "Biking", featuring rappers Jay-Z and fellow Odd Future member Tyler, the Creator who have both previously collaborated with Ocean. He previously streamed a trailer for the song on his website, featuring a different instrumental.

On April 23, 2017, Episode 004 aired and featured "Lens", which included an alternative version featuring rapper Travis Scott. The next morning, Episode 005 aired with a Young Thug remix of the song "Slide On Me" from Ocean's 2016 video album Endless.

On May 15, 2017, Episode 006 aired with the first single from ASAP Mob's then-upcoming album Cozy Tapes Vol. 2: Too Cozy. RAF features vocals from ASAP Rocky, Quavo, Lil Uzi Vert, two different rap verses from Ocean, and additional vocals from Playboi Carti. A solo version of "Biking" with no featured artists and a new third verse was also aired. After a summer hiatus due to Ocean performing at music festivals, Episode 007 aired on August 27, 2017, with the single "Provider".

Hiatus and specials (2017-2019)
On December 12, 2017, a fictionalized version of the show was launched in Grand Theft Auto V and its online counterpart Grand Theft Auto Online, as an in-game radio station called blonded Los Santos 97.8 FM, as part of a content update.

On November 6, 2018, three midterm specials were aired throughout the day, in collation with the midterm elections that were held in the United States, as well as the release of new merchandise given to those with proof of voting for free in Houston, Atlanta, Miami, and Dallas. On December 25, 2018, Ocean premiered "blonded Xmas", a curated Christmas music playlist. None of these episodes featured any new music.

A Blonded Radio poster was put up on sale on February 24, 2019, with a message reading:

Return to air and PrEP+ (2019)
On October 19, 2019, Ocean hosted his first PrEP+ party. It was described as an “homage to what could have been of the 1980s' NYC club scene if the [HIV-preventing] drug PrEP (pre-exposure prophylaxis)... had been invented in that era.” The poster for the event featured the words “Blonded Radio”. During the party, two remixes were played for unreleased songs by Ocean: Dear April (Justice Remix) and Cayendo (Sango Remix). New merchandise was made available on the blonded.co website following the event, as well as a listing for both songs on vinyl. Highlights from the event were aired on blonded 008 the same day, including the new song “DHL”, which released soon after the event.

On October 24, 2019, the second PrEP+ party was held, which featured Ocean's remix of fellow artist SZA's song “The Weekend”. All four of the DJs at the event (Leeon, Arca, Papi Juice and Shyboi) were queer. The song was never featured on blonded Radio.

On October 31, 2019, the third party took place. It was themed around Halloween. The party also featured an unreleased collaboration with British rapper Skepta, called “Little Demon (Arca Remix)”. The song aired during blonded 009, on November 3, 2019, alongside “In My Room”.

On November 9, 2019, Episode 010 aired, and became the first ever episode to feature no new music.

On December 24, 2021, a new Christmas special episode of Blonded Radio aired, titled "blonded Xmas".

List of episodes

2017

2018

2019

2021

2022

See also
 Blonde
 Beats 1

References

Frank Ocean
Internet radio in the United States